"Say Something" is a song recorded by American singer-songwriter Justin Timberlake featuring vocals by fellow American singer-songwriter Chris Stapleton. It was released on January 25, 2018, as the third single from his fifth studio album Man of the Woods (2018) along with its music video. The song was written and produced by Timberlake, Larrance Dopson, Floyd Nathaniel Hills, and Timbaland, with additional songwriting by Stapleton. It debuted at number 9 on the US Billboard Hot 100, becoming Timberlake's 19th top 10 single as a solo artist and Stapleton's first. It also reached number one in Slovakia and Slovenia and the top 10 in Austria, Belgium, Canada, Czech Republic, Germany, Hungary, the Netherlands, Poland, Scotland, Switzerland, and the United Kingdom. It was serviced to contemporary hit radio on February 13, 2018. A live version of the song was released on March 31. "Say Something" received a nomination for Best Pop Duo/Group Performance at the 61st Annual Grammy Awards.

Background
Justin Timberlake and Chris Stapleton first collaborated at the 2015 Country Music Association Awards, performing "Tennessee Whiskey" and "Drink You Away". Stapleton was initially only writing songs with Timberlake for the album, before being asked to sing on "Say Something". He told Billboard, "I really just went out to Los Angeles to write songs with him, it's a very fluid process with him, there's a lot going on. That was one of those things where there wasn't necessarily a plan. He was like 'All right, you hop in there and take a verse,' and I'm like, 'You want me to do what?' ... It came out great. I had a blast with him, he's a great creative force and one of those guys that if you get a chance to work with him, you should."

Composition and interpretation
"Say Something" is an upbeat country rock ballad that blends the electronic structures of Man of the Woods previously released songs "Filthy" and "Supplies" with Stapleton's country blues styles. The song comprises elements of gospel, pop, acoustic soul and jazz. Timberlake and Timbaland previously incorporated country sounds such as twangy guitars on tracks like "What Goes Around... Comes Around". The song features lyrics about reflection and regret, meditating on social pressure to have something to say and being unsure if you really do. Nashville Scene writer Stephen Trageser interpreted the lyrics as:

Music video

Directed by Arturo Perez Jr. and produced by La Blogothèque, the video was filmed using a technique known as "continuous motion" and shot in one take at the  Bradbury Building in Los Angeles – famous for its appearance in the 1982 science fiction film Blade Runner – with elevators, balconies, and stairs that "personified the labyrinth" the concept required. The crew included 17 musicians and a 60-person choir, in order to record the video and audio live in only one take. The video starts with Timberlake alone in a room creating beats and effects on a Maschine sampler. The camera follows him as he straps on an acoustic guitar and ascends up an elevator. Stepping out, he encounters Stapleton on a nearby staircase. The music video on YouTube has received over 400 million views as of January 2023.

It won Best Live Video at the 2018 UK Music Video Awards. It received nominations for Video of the Year and Collaborative Video of the Year at the 2018 CMT Music Awards, for an MTV Video Music Award for Best Direction, and for an iHeartRadio Much Music Video Award for Best Director. It also received a nomination for Best Music Video at the 2018 Camerimage Festival.

Critical reception
Lauren Tingle of CMT gave the song a positive review, writing "it definitely sounds like it could have been born in Timberlake's musically rich home state of Tennessee. The pop singer's high tenor and Stapleton's gravelly  melisma accent the song's driving acoustic rhythm guitars, horns and syncopated percussion." In Billboard, Natalie Maher stated the climax of the song occurs "as the two are joined by a full choir, and added band, and then slowly comes down off itself with the line, "maybe it's greatest to say nothing."" Stephen Trageser of Nashville Scene deemed the track "an anthemic tune about something ostensibly honorable," and went on to interpret the lyrics. Cillea Houghton of Taste of Country called the song a "jam" where the singer "trade lines on an upbeat, genre-less track that could easily nestle into country radio." Emily Yahr of The Washington Post said the song "has a guitar-driven sound that could theoretically fit into the modern country world." Billboards critics ranked it among the best songs of the first half of 2018.

Uproxx's Aaron Williams opined the blend of styles created "a surprisingly danceable groove that isn't too far off from Timberlake's usual comfort zone," and added "their voices also blend well." Will Lavin of Joe expressed "Say Something" is a "more refined Justin Timberlake. It feels like an organic blend of musical elements. From the hip hop-inspired drums, to the country-driven guitar riff, gospel harmonies, and triumphant introspective vocals, you're left feeling satisfied... this is JT at his best and most honest." Forrest Wickman of Slate said the "long-anticipated duet lives up to the hype." For Idolator, Mike Neid said it is "the first song that truly feels on brand with the more organic styling of Man of the Woods. It feels like a bit of a risk for JT, but it is one that should pay off," and opined it was the "best" on the album so far. HotNewHipHop said it is different from his previous singles as it leans towards folk music, "but it's still another solid offering from Timberlake." In a guitar video tutorial for this song, musician Scott Mathson says that learning the song on guitar is simple, as it contains "pretty easy guitar chords". MTV's Madeline Roth said the song is "as close to Timberlake's Memphis roots as he's gotten so far... and it's a promising sign of things to come," while MTV UK's Sam Prance stated Timberlake "deliver some of the best vocals of his career to date. Not to mention, the chorus is massive and Chris complements Justin perfectly on it."

Pitchforks Marc Hogan in an unfavorable review said "apparently, the two have nothing to say, and they're absurdly proud of it." Spins Winston Cook-Wilson felt it is not the single for a listener that is "looking for clever, poignant, or just remotely sensical turns of phrase.".

Entertainment Weekly named "Say Something" the ninth best song of 2018 on their year-end list. Billboard critics ranked it as the 74th best song of the year.

Awards

Commercial performance 
In the United States, "Say Something" debuted at number nine on the Billboard Hot 100 with 98,000 downloads sold, after selling additional 21,000 before the tracking week, and 12.8 million streams. It also marked Timberlake's seventh number one on Digital Songs, and first since "Can't Stop the Feeling!" in 2016. The song has sold 431,000 downloads in the country as of June 2018.

In 2018, "Say Something" was ranked as the 85th most popular song of the year on the Billboard Hot 100.

In 2019, "Say Something" was certified Platinum in the UK exactly one year after its release, becoming his sixth Platinum seller in the country as a solo artist.

Live performances
On February 5, 2018, Timberlake and Stapleton performed "Say Something" on the post-Super Bowl episode of The Tonight Show Starring Jimmy Fallon. On February 21, 2018, both artists performed the song at the 2018 Brit Awards.

"Say Something" has also been performed at every show on Timberlake's sixth concert tour, The Man of the Woods Tour.

Track listing

Credits and personnel
Justin Timberlake – production, vocal production, guitar
Timbaland – production
Danja – production
Larrance Dopson - additional production
Chris Stapleton – featured vocals, guitar
Chris Godbey – engineer
Ben Sedano – assistant engineering
Elliot Ives – guitar

Charts

Weekly charts

Year-end charts

Certifications

Release history

References

2010s ballads
2018 singles
2018 songs
Chris Stapleton songs
Country ballads
Country rock songs
Justin Timberlake songs
RCA Records singles
Rock ballads
Song recordings produced by Danja (record producer)
Song recordings produced by Justin Timberlake
Song recordings produced by Timbaland
Songs written by Chris Stapleton
Songs written by Danja (record producer)
Songs written by Justin Timberlake
Songs written by Timbaland
Songs written by Larrance Dopson